Byron Wayne Hughes (born 8 March 1958) is a Welsh former professional footballer who played as a midfielder. During his career, he made over 50 appearances in the Football League during spells with West Bromwich Albion and Cardiff City and also played in the NASL for Tulsa Roughnecks. He also represented Wales at youth level, winning three caps for the Wales under-21 team.

Career

Having had unsuccessful trials with Everton, Leeds United and Manchester City, Hughes began his career with West Bromwich Albion, joining the club's youth system as an apprentice in 1974. He went on to captain the Baggies youth side and was part of the team that won the 1976 FA Youth Cup final against Wolverhampton Wanderers. He signed his first professional contract with West Brom in March 1976 made his debut in May 1977, in the final match of the 1976–77 season, during a 4–0 defeat against Aston Villa. However, he struggled to establish himself in the first-team and made eight appearances during his time with the club. He instead joined the Tulsa Roughnecks in the North American Soccer League in January 1979 and scored 12 times during his only season at the club.

In October 1979, Cardiff City manager Richie Morgan paid £70,000 to bring Hughes to the club, making his debut for the club on 6 October 1979 in a 2–1 victory over Luton Town. He remained with the club for three seasons as they struggled in the Second Division and was released at the end of the 1981–82 season after they suffered relegation to Division Three. Following his release, he joined Bath City but retired from football after a single season. He later decided to return to football after eight months, playing for Bath for a second time and later had spells with Paulton Rovers and Yeovil Town.

Later life
After retiring from football, Hughes worked as a pub landlord in Swansea before becoming a hotelier in Blackpool.
Wayne then played Sunday football he played for Burn Naze FC,  and in the 1989 local cup final beat Mammas FC 5-1,he then played for the famous Mammas FC in Blackpool winning back to back Lancashire Sunday Trophy titles in 1993 and 1994 as well as being the only team to win the "Grand Slam" of four trophies in 1993.

References

1958 births
Living people
Welsh footballers
Sportspeople from Port Talbot
West Bromwich Albion F.C. players
Tulsa Roughnecks (1978–1984) players
Cardiff City F.C. players
Bath City F.C. players
Paulton Rovers F.C. players
Yeovil Town F.C. players
English Football League players
North American Soccer League (1968–1984) players
Association football midfielders
Wales youth international footballers
Wales under-21 international footballers
Welsh expatriate sportspeople in the United States
Expatriate soccer players in the United States
Welsh expatriate footballers